Tongan may refer to:
 Something of, from, or related to the country of Tonga 
Tongans, people from Tonga
Tongan language, the national language of Tonga
Tong'an District, a district in Xiamen, Fujian, China

See also
Tonga (disambiguation)
Tonga language (disambiguation)
Tonga people (Malawi)
Tonga people (Zambia and Zimbabwe)

Language and nationality disambiguation pages